Eumecosomyia lacteivittata is a species of ulidiid or picture-winged fly in the genus Eumecosomyia of the family Ulidiidae.

References

Ulidiidae
Insects described in 1909